The Cobb Building is an eleven-story building in Seattle, Washington. It was the third structure in Seattle's Metropolitan Tract and the only surviving of several buildings in the 10-acre tract of its design that once lined both sides of 4th Avenue. The Howells & Stokes architectural firm designed the building and sent Albert H. Albertson to supervise its 1909-1910 construction. Sculpted Native American ornaments at the 9th and 10th floor cornice are attributed to Victor G. Schneider. An early example of a high-rise medical office center, the Cobb Building later became commercial office space and recently was renovated for apartments.

References

External links
 
 Cobb Apartments

Residential skyscrapers in Seattle
Downtown Seattle
1910s architecture in the United States
National Register of Historic Places in Seattle
Office buildings completed in 1910
Office buildings on the National Register of Historic Places in Washington (state)
Terracotta sculptures in the United States